Liebling (formerly Brist; ;  or Kedvenc) is a commune in Timiș County, Romania. It is composed of three villages: Cerna, Iosif and Liebling (commune seat).

Geography 
Liebling is located in the southwest of Timiș County, 35 km from Timișoara and 20 km from Ciacova, the nearest town.

Hydrography 
Liebling belongs to the Timiș river basin. Tofoaia Valley crosses Liebling to the north, flowing into the Timiș River through the Birda-Lanca Canal.

Climate 
The influence of the Mediterranean and oceanic air masses makes the winters shorter and milder with a positive average temperature of 0.2 °C, the coldest month being January. Springs are earlier and warmer, but short and with large temperature variations caused by the activity of cyclones in the Mediterranean and the Atlantic. Summers are long and hot. Autumns are also long, conducive to harvesting.

History 
The first recorded mention of a settlement on present-day Liebling dates from 1332. The medieval village was called Beesd and appears in papal tithe records as having a parish. Around 1597, in a Hungarian diploma, it is mentioned as Briszt. 

The modern village was established in 1786–1788 by colonizing Protestant Germans from Pfalz and Nuremberg. The village was built according to a well-established plan by the Timișoara administration, under the supervision of Commissioner Wallbrunn, who ordered the construction of 290 new houses, with straight and parallel streets. In the first year only 102 families arrived, the rest came later. The commune thus founded was named by Commissioner Wallbrunn Vécsháza, after the then governor of Banat. According to oral tradition, the governor, because he loved Protestants, changed it to Liebling (meaning "darling" in German), a name that became official in 1828, the year the Evangelical Lutheran church was built.

After World War I, Romanian families moved here from the current Alba County, which, through the agrarian reform, were put in possession of land (1926). The Romanian population grew post-war, the Germans migrated massively, especially after 1989 and the commune is today mostly Romanian.

Demographics 

Liebling had a population of 3,723 inhabitants at the 2011 census, down 0.3% from the 2002 census. Most inhabitants are Romanians (86.95%), larger minorities being represented by Roma (4.27%) and Hungarians (3.38%). For 3.84% of the population, ethnicity is unknown. By religion, most inhabitants are Orthodox (76.82%), but there are also minorities of Pentecostals (6.47%), Greek Catholics (4.75%), Roman Catholics (4.65%) and Baptists (1.75%). For 3.89% of the population, religious affiliation is unknown.

Notes

References 

Communes in Timiș County
Localities in Romanian Banat
Former Danube Swabian communities in Romania